Secret Journey may refer to:

 "Secret Journey" (song), a 1981 song by The Police. 
 Secret Journey (1939 film) 
 Secret Journey (2006 film) 
 Secret Journey (2016 series) A japanese Hentai anime and manga series by Po-ju